Kluczbork  is a town in southern Poland with 23,554 inhabitants (2019), situated in the Opole Voivodeship. It is the capital of Kluczbork County and an important railroad junction. In Kluczbork the major rail line from Katowice splits into two directions – westwards to Wrocław and northwards to Poznań. It is also connected with Fosowskie.

History

Archaeologists have determined that a settlement existed at the location of present-day Kluczbork by 1000–800 BCE. The Germanic Sciri and Bastarnae settled in the vicinity, and were followed c. 100 BCE by Celts and various Germanic tribes, including Silingi and Vandals. The latter left Silesia c. 400 and West Slavs came to the region in the 7th century (see Silesians). In the late 10th century the Silesian territory was included in the emerging Polish state by its first historic ruler Mieszko I.

In the 13th century the Knights of the Cross with the Red Star acquired territory in Silesia, including the villages of Młodoszów, Kuniów, and Chocianowice. The Knights built a settlement on November 2, 1252 . Named Cruceburg  (later spelled Creutzburg, Creuzburg, Kreuzburg), it received Magdeburg rights on February 26, 1253, now accepted as the official date of the town's foundation. The Knights adjudicated in the town until 1274, when it started to be administered by a vogt of local Silesian dukes and juries were introduced. As a result of the dynastic fragmentation of Poland, Kluczbork was part of various Polish duchies ruled by the Piast dynasty: Duchy of Silesia until 1293, Duchy of Głogów until 1312, Duchy of Oleśnica until 1323 and Duchy of Legnica until 1341, when it came under direct rule of the King of Poland, Casimir III the Great. In 1356 it passed to the Czech Crown, and continued to belong to various duchies ruled by the Piast dynasty. From 1536 it was part of the Piast-ruled Duchy of Brzeg until its dissolution in 1675. Afterwards it was incorporated into the Habsburg monarchy, as part of the Habsburg-ruled Czech Kingdom.

A mint operated in Kluczbork during the reign of Duke Bolesław III the Generous, in the early 14th century. In 1426 Duke Louis II of Brzeg granted Kluczbork privileges of a salt market. For centuries the town was inhabited by a predominantly Polish-speaking populace. The textile industry began to grow in importance in 1553, but suffered a fire in 1569. Another great fire destroyed many houses on December 8, 1562. On January 25, 1588, the day after the Battle of Byczyna, Polish troops under Jan Zamoyski plundered the city. The townspeople accepted the Protestant Reformation in 1656 and converted the local Roman Catholic Church into a Lutheran one. The Polish Brethren settled in the city after 1660, and organized their synods in the city in 1663 and 1668. The town had a population of approximately 1,000 in 1681.

A fire on April 23, 1737, almost completely destroyed the town, leaving only a few houses and the castle unscathed. Several years of rebuilding passed before it reached its previous size.

In the 18th century Kreuzburg was annexed by the Kingdom of Prussia in 1741 during the Silesian Wars and became part of the Prussian Province of Silesia. Under Prussian rule the town and the region saw a large influx of German-speaking settlers.

The town became part of the German Empire upon the unification of Germany in 1871. It had a predominantly German-speaking population of 5,238 in 1875, although it was located in a Polish-dominated district. The population grew to 8,750 by 1895 and 10,236 by 1900.

Following the Treaty of Versailles after World War I, Kreuzburg was involved in the Upper Silesian referendum in 1921. 95.6% (37,957 votes out of 39,703 participants) voted to remain within Weimar Germany instead of joining the Second Polish Republic. It became part of the Province of Upper Silesia; to differentiate between other places named Kreuzburg, it was known as Kreuzburg O.S. (referring to Oberschlesien, or Upper Silesia). By 1939 the town was the seat of Landkreis Kreuzburg O.S. and had 11,693 inhabitants. After the Nazi Party took power in Germany in the 1930s, anti-Polish and anti-Jewish sentiments became more visible. In 1936, the Germans changed the Polish-sounding street names, and in 1938, during the Kristallnacht they burned down the synagogue, built in 1886. During World War II, in 1939, the Germans established the Oflag VIII A prisoner of war camp in the city, and in 1943 they transformed it into the Ilag VIII/Z camp for interned citizens of the United Kingdom and the United States. The Germans evacuated the populace before the advancing Soviet army in January 1945.

The town was captured by the Soviet Union's Red Army on 20 January 1945 toward the end of World War II. Following the war in 1945, the town became part of Poland.

A monument of Jan Dzierżon, pioneering and world-famous Polish apiarist, was unveiled in 1981.

Economy

Kluczbork's economy is dominated by the production of machinery, knitwear and construction material, alongside newly emerging industries, namely: the transport sector, trade, agriculture and the food production sector as well as being the centre for the Kluczbork County's banks and other financial institutions. The Gmina Kluczbork has some 1800 businesses (1300 of which are located within the city's boundaries). The largest factories in Kluczbork are: Fabryka Maszyn i Urządzeń „Famak” (machinery production), PV „Prefabet - Kluczbork” S.A. (concrete materials) and Wagrem sp. z o.o. Kluczbork (weighing scale repairs).

The part of the town of Kluczbork, around Ligota Dolna, is part of the Wałbrzych Special Economic Zone (area of 53939 ha). The current investors in the Wałbrzych Special Economic Zone are: Marcegaglia Poland, Inpol-Krak Tubes Service Center and the German Seppeler Gruppe Ocynkownia Śląsk (galvanisation company).

Sport
MKS Kluczbork is a professional association football club founded in 2003 as a result of a merger of two local clubs.

Notable people

 Adam Gdacjusz (1615–1688), parish priest in this city
 Samuel Crellius (1660–1747), philosopher and theologian
 Jan Dzierżon (1811–1906), apiarist
 Gustav Freytag (1816–1895), dramatist and novelist
 Walther von Lüttwitz (1859, Bogacica, near this city – 1942)
 Kurt Daluege (1897–1946), Nazi SS police chief executed for war crimes
 Heinz Piontek (1925–2003), author
 Edyta Górniak (born 1972), singer
 Tomasz Garbowski (born 1979), politician

Twin towns – sister cities
See twin towns of Gmina Kluczbork.

Gallery

References

External links

 Jewish Community in Kluczbork on Virtual Shtetl

 
Cities in Silesia
Cities and towns in Opole Voivodeship
Kluczbork County